was a village located in Kitauonuma District, Niigata Prefecture, Japan.

As of 2003, the village had an estimated population of 4,663 and a density of 38.85 persons per km². The total area was 120.03 km².

On November 1, 2004, Sumon, along with the towns of Horinouchi and Koide, and the villages of Hirokami, Irihirose and Yunotani (all from Kitauonuma District), was merged to create the city of Uonuma.

Transportation

Railway
 JR East - Tadami Line
  -

Highway

See also
 Uonuma

External links
 Uonuma Tourist Association 

Dissolved municipalities of Niigata Prefecture
Uonuma, Niigata